Margaret Mary Julia Devlin (née Ashford; 3 April 1881 – 15 January 1972), known as Daisy Ashford, was an English writer who is most famous for writing The Young Visiters, a novella concerning the upper class society of late 19th century England, when she was just nine years old. The novella was published in 1919, preserving her juvenile spelling and punctuation.  She wrote the title as "Viseters" in her manuscript, but it was published as "Visiters".

Life

Early life and education

Daisy Ashford was born on 3 April 1881 in Petersham, Surrey, the eldest of three daughters born to Emma Georgina Walker and William Henry Roxburgh Ashford. She was largely educated at home with her sisters Maria Veronica 'Vera' (born 1882) and Angela Mary 'Angie' (born 1884).

Career
At the age of four Daisy dictated her first story, The Life of Father McSwiney, to her father; it was published in 1983. From 1889 to 1896 she and her family lived at 44 St Anne's Crescent, Lewes, where she wrote The Young Visiters. She wrote several other stories; a play, A Woman's Crime; and one other short novel, The Hangman's Daughter, which she considered to be her best work. Some stories written by Ashford are lost.

She stopped writing during her teens. In 1896 the family moved to the Wallands area of Lewes, and in 1904 she moved with her family to Bexhill, and then to London where she worked as a secretary. She ran a canteen in Dover during the First World War.  When published in 1919, The Young Visiters was an immediate success, and several of her other stories were published in 1920.  Ashford bought a farm on the proceeds of The Young Visiters and once observed, “I like fresh air — and royalties.” She did not write in later years, although in old age she did begin an autobiography which she later destroyed.

Personal life
In 1920, at the age of 38, Ashford married James Devlin with whom she had four children. They ran a flower-growing business near Norwich and later the King's Arms Hotel in Reepham for a year. Devlin died in 1956.

Death
She died on 15 January 1972 in Norwich, England, and was buried at Earlham Road Cemetery there.

Legacy
Edmund Wilson referred to the novel This Side of Paradise by his friend F. Scott Fitzgerald as "a classic in a class with The Young Visiters", a way of deeming the style childish or naïve.

Published writings

  The Young Visiters, or, Mr Salteena's Plan.  London: Chatto and Windus,  1919
 Daisy Ashford: Her Book: A Collection of the Remaining Novels.  London: George H. Doran and Company, 1920
 Love and Marriage: Three Stories. London: Hart-Davis, 1965
 Where Love Lies Deepest. London: Hart-Davis, 1966
 The Hangman's Daughter and Other Stories. Oxford University Press 1983  (Includes The Life of Father McSwiney)

See also

 Child prodigy

References

Further reading
 Malcomson, R. M. (1984). Daisy Ashford: Her Life. Hogarth Press.
 "Ashford [married name Devlin], Margaret Mary Julia [Daisy] (1881–1972), child writer". Oxford Dictionary of National Biography.  Retrieved 9 July 2019, from https://www.oxforddnb.com/view/10.1093/ref:odnb/9780198614128.001.0001/odnb-9780198614128-e-30769.

External links

 
 
 
 
 "Daisy Ashford a Very Real Young Lady", 31 August 1919, The New York Times Book Review, Page 74

English women novelists
British child writers
1881 births
1972 deaths
People from Surrey (before 1889)
20th-century English novelists
20th-century English women writers
People from Reepham, Norfolk
People from Richmond, London